Crystina Poncher (born July 20, 1984) is currently a commentator, host and reporter for Top Rank Boxing on ESPN. She previously served as host, reporter and correspondent for NFL Network and NFL.com.

Career

In her role with Top Rank, she is currently the only female play-by-play broadcaster in boxing, after nearly a decade involved in the sport. She calls the international broadcast for Top Rank and the undercards for ESPN+. She also and has interviewed some of boxing's biggest stars.

With the NFL, Crystina's duties included serving as an in-studio host for the NFL Network and as a reporter and correspondent for NFL.com's, NFL Fan Pass, which gives viewers inside access to all things NFL related.

Previously, Crystina worked as a reporter and host for Fox Sports West and Prime Ticket and FoxSports.com. She was an in-studio host for FoxSports.com, contributing news updates as a part of the Fox Sports Flash. Additionally, she reported from the sidelines for college basketball on Fox Sports West and Prime Ticket.

Personal life
Crystina graduated with honors from Long Beach State, with a bachelor's degree in Broadcast Journalism and minor in Communications.

Poncher is married and has two children. She currently resides in Southern California.

References 

https://sports.yahoo.com/neither-make-artist-ring-card-girl-crystina-poncher-eager-blaze-trail-women-broadcasting-002602285.html

External links 

Crystina Poncher Bio

People from California
American television reporters and correspondents
Boxing commentators
National Football League announcers
College basketball announcers in the United States
College football announcers
California State University, Long Beach alumni
American television sports anchors
American television sports announcers
Women sports announcers
Living people
American women television journalists
1984 births
21st-century American women